The Royal Lao Armed Forces, best known by its French acronym FAR, were the official armed defense forces of the Kingdom of Laos, a state that existed from 1949 to 1975 in what is now the Lao People's Democratic Republic. First created under the French protectorate of Laos on July 1, 1949, the FAR was responsible for the defense of the Kingdom since its independence in October 1953 from France, until its dissolution on December 2, 1975. It operated notably during the North Vietnamese invasion of Laos and the Laotian Civil War from 1960 to 1975.

History

The foundations of the Royal Lao Armed Forces were laid on May 11, 1947 when King Sisavang Vong granted a constitution declaring Laos an independent nation (and a Kingdom from 1949) within the colonial framework of French Indochina. This act signalled the creation of a Laotian government capable of building its own administration over the next few years, including the establishment of a national defense force. The new Laotian military was officially created on July 1, 1949 from a collection of pre-existing Lao police and militarized constabulary units, regular colonial indigenous troops, and locally raised irregular auxiliaries. 
However, the formation process was soon hampered by the developments of the ongoing First Indochina War in neighbouring Vietnam, and it was only in 1952 that the National Laotian Army ( or ANL) – the predecessor of the Royal Lao Army – really began to take shape.

By July 1959, it was known as the Laotian Armed Forces ( – FAL), and in September 1961, was renamed Royal Armed Forces ( – FAR).

Command structure
Throughout its existence, the Laotian Armed Forces were plagued by an ineffective leadership, particularly at senior levels, which often led to chain-of-command problems. The earlier colonial ANL units in the French Protectorate of Laos consisted mostly of uneducated Laotian peasant recruits led by French officers and senior NCOs; those few Laotians promoted from the ranks rose no further than the command of a company. After the Kingdom of Laos gained its independence in late 1953, the few Laotian officers with military experience were quickly promoted to much higher command positions than they were accustomed to. To further aggrieve matters, the Laotian Armed Forces command structure became highly politicized in the early 1960s, where the support of key political figures was of paramount importance in promotion to and retention of command positions. This meant that Laotian military upper echelons of command were not immune to political interference, in the form of patronage, cronyism and nepotism, since many officers were also commissioned into senior command posts directly from civilian life; these men owed their positions to family or political connections rather than any military training or ability. The few urban elite families who dominated Laotian society felt it advantageous to have family members or friends in key posts of the military establishment. These politically-appointed officers indulged in political manoeuvres (the 1959, 1960, 1964, 1965, 1966, and 1973 Laotian coups) or involved themselves in profitable illicit activities (bribery, kickbacks, racketeering, gambling, prostitution, gold-smuggling, and the Opium trade), rather than learning their trade. As a result, the FAR officer corps was riven by corruption and inefficiency, exacerbated by political divisions and even personal rivalries at all echelons of command. Both professional and personal jealousy was not unknown amongst Laotian higher Commanders, which resulted in endless internal squabbles, and little effort was made to coordinate their activities, rendering the Command, control and coordination of military operations problematic.

This situation was further complicated by a decentralised command structure, in which the FAR General Staff ( – EMG) in Vientiane served primarily an administrative function, exerting little control over the regional commands and local commanders were free to adjust their tactics to the local situation. Laos had a long-standing "warlord" tradition of local power-brokers, and consequently, real power was in the hands of the regional commanders (usually Colonels or Generals) who manned the military districts (or "Military Regions" – MR) in the provinces, which operated like autonomous fiefdoms. With the formation of the Mobile Groups (French: Groupements mobiles – GMs) at each Laotian Military Region in the early 1960s, the MR Commanders' influence was challenged by the growing power of the GM Commanders (Majors or Lieutenant colonels), who acted as junior "warlords". In practice, the Military Region's commanders used the GMs as their private armies to further their own interests, rarely dispatching them outside the Mekong River valley. A high-echelon command position within a Military Region was dependent upon the influence of an urban elite aristocratic family who economically and politically dominated the MR. If a general was not a scion of one of these families, then he had to get their support in some other manner.

Regional commands

Laos was divided since 1955 into five Military Regions roughly corresponding to the areas of the country's 13 provinces. The Military Regions were the basis of the warlordism culture that affected the ANL and the FAR high command, with most of the MR Commanders running their zones like private fiefdoms.

Branches
By September 1961 the Royal Lao Armed Forces consisted of three conventional ground, air and naval branches of service.  Their primarily roles were: guarantee the sovereignty of the King, ensure internal stability and security by maintaining the social and political order, and defend the Kingdom of Laos against external aggression. Subordinated to the Ministry of Defense of the Royal Lao Government at the capital Vientiane, the FAR branches were organized as follows:

 Royal Lao Army ( – ARL)
 Royal Lao Air Force ( – AVRL)
 Royal Lao Navy ( – MRL)

Elite formations

 Royal Lao Army Airborne
 Military Region 5 Commandos
 Commando Raider Teams
 SPECOM
 Special Guerrilla Units (SGU)
 Directorate of National Coordination

Training institutions
Prior to its independence in October 1953, Laos lacked almost completely a professional military school system – Officer, Non-commissioned officer (NCO) and Staff schools, plus Technical and Branch training schools – for its Armed Forces, and relied heavily on foreign assistance to train its personnel.  Beginning in the early 1950s, Laotian Officers and selected enlisted men were sent overseas to attend specialized courses and advanced schools, and this practice would continue throughout the 1960s and early 1970s.  However, a small indigenous training infrastructure (initially run exclusively by the French) gradually began to take shape during the last years of the First Indochina War, and as the Laotian Civil War progressed, it was expanded with the help of the American aid programs, with most of the training being carried out by U.S. advisors.

Lao Military Academy and Staff College
The first Laotian military schools were established by the French Union Army Command in 1952, with the creation at Pakse and Vientiane of two NCO training schools, later merged into a single institution, the Reserve Cadres Training Centre ( – CFCR), soon followed by a Reserve Officers Training School ( – EOR). First set up at Pakse, the latter institution was later transferred to Dong Hene in Savannakhet Province, which eventually became the Lao Military Academy. A Staff and Command school, the Military Institution of Higher Learning ( – IHEM), and an Accountancy School were also established at the time in Vientiane.

Laotian Armed Forces training Centres
Six Laotian Armed Forces training Centres ( – CFFAR) were established jointly by the French and U.S. Operation Hotfoot mobile training team advisors at Khang Khay in Military Region 2 (MR 2), at Kilometre 17 (KM 17) and Kilometre 22 (KM 22) both located northeast of Vientiane on Route 13, and at Luang Prabang, Savannakhet and Pakse between July 1959 and March 1960, in order to provide basic infantry and Ranger training to both regular RLA and irregular SGU Laotian troops.

Airborne training centres
To train Laotian paratrooper battalions, airborne training centres were established by the French at Wattay Air Base just outside Vientiane in September 1948, followed later in February 1960 by Vang Vieng, located 17 kilometres (15.60 miles) from Vientiane, set up with the help of U.S. Military Assistance Advisory Group (Laos) advisors, and at Seno, near Savannakhet by French Military Mission in Laos advisors. A fourth Parachute School was briefly established by the Neutralists in 1961 at Muang Phanh in Xiangkhouang Province, but the Pathet Lao offensive held in early May 1964 forced the training staff to relocate to Vang Vieng.

Commando and infantry training centres
In the midst of the 1971 reorganization, two dual commando/infantry training centres were set up by the Americans at Phou Khao Khouai, north of Vientiane and Seno near Savannakhet for the Royal Lao Army (RLA) new strike divisions; the teaching staff consisted of several Laotian graduates of the U.S. Special Forces (USSF) course at Fort Bragg, North Carolina, in the United States. A third one, the CIA-run PS 18 secret camp near Pakse in Champassak Province was used for two RLA brigades being raised in the Fourth Military Region (MR 4).

Armour training centre
In December 1961, the Neutralists set up an Armoured Training Centre at Ban Phong Savang in Savannakhet Province, with the help of NVA instructors to train Neutralist personnel in PT-76 amphibious light tank tactics and maintenance, though it was later shut down by the Pathet Lao offensive of May 1964.

Aviation school
A flying school was first established by the French at Wattay Air Base in January 1955 to train Laotian pilot cadets, later transferred to Seno Air Base and placed under the control of the RLAF's Air Training Command – ATC ( – CEA).

Foreign assistance

Throughout its existence, the Laotian Armed Forces received military assistance at different periods and lengths of time from several countries, including France, the United Kingdom, the United States, Thailand, Burma, the Philippines, the Republic of China (Taiwan), South Vietnam, Indonesia, Australia, and (briefly) from North Vietnam and the Soviet Union.

To meet the threat represented by the Pathet Lao insurgency, the Laotian Armed Forces depended on a small French military training mission ( – MMFI-GRL), headed by a general officer, an exceptional arrangement permitted under the 1955 Geneva Accords, as well as covert assistance from the United States in the form of the Programs Evaluation Office (PEO), established on 15 December 1955, replaced in 1961 by the Military Assistance Advisory Group (Laos), which was later changed in September 1962 into the Requirements Office. Between 1962 and 1971, the U.S. provided Laos with direct military assistance, but not including the cost of equipping and training irregular and paramilitary forces by the Central Intelligence Agency (CIA).

Laotian student candidate officers and senior officers were first sent to France, and later Thailand and the United States, to receive basic officer and advanced staff training in their respective Military Academies and Staff Colleges. At least ten Laotian Aspirants were sent to the prestigious Saint Cyr Military Academy in France, whilst senior officers attended staff courses at the School of Advanced Military Studies in Paris; other Laotian officers received their staff training at the United States Army Command and General Staff College in Fort Leavenworth, Kansas. In addition, a small number of Laotian naval officer candidate students ( – EOMs) were also sent to France, in order to attend advanced Officer and Petty Officer courses at the French Naval Academy in Brest.

Paratrooper and 'Commando' units were sent overseas to receive advanced airborne and reconnaissance training, with Laotian pupils attending the Scout Ranger course at Fort William McKinley in Manila, the Philippines, manned by Philippine Army instructors; others attended Para-commando courses manned by Indonesian Army instructors at their airborne training centre located at Batujajar, near Bandung, Indonesia. Further airborne and Ranger training was provided by the Royal Thai Army (RTA) at their Special Warfare Centre and Recondo School co-located at Fort Narai in Lopburi Province, Thailand, while Guerrilla and 'Commando' techniques were taught by the Royal Thai Police (RTP) Police Aerial Resupply Unit (PARU) at their Phitsanulok and Hua Hin training camps. In late 1969, 76 RLA students were dispatched to the RTA Kokethiem training centre in Thailand for training in M-706 armoured car tactics and maintenance, whilst 25 Laotian officers and NCOs were sent to the U.S. Army Armor School at Fort Knox, Kentucky to attend the Armor Basic Officer Leaders Course and the Cavalry Leader Course. That same year, a number of Laotian students attended the U.S. Special Forces (USSF) course at Fort Bragg, North Carolina.

In late 1955, 22 Royal Laotian Air Force cadets attended flight courses at the École de l'air in France and Morocco, though five RLAF pilot students were sent in 1962 to the United States to receive training on the T-28 at Moody Air Force Base, Georgia; Laotian pilots and air crews were later sent for 0-1, UH-1, T-28, EC-47, AC-47, and C-123 training to South Vietnam and Thailand.  Most of the advanced courses and specialized training of Laotian combat pilots was conducted by American advisors of Detachment 1, 56th Special Operations Wing at Udorn, U-Tapao, and Takhli airbases in Thailand, while others were dispatched to attend observer courses at Bien Hoa Air Base, South Vietnam. Additional training was provided in Laos by U.S. Air America instructors to RLAF's C-123 pilots and maintenance crews between January 1973 and July 1974.

See also
 1967 Opium War
 Air America
 Battle of Lang Vei
 Forces Armées Neutralistes
 Laotian Civil War
 Lao People's Armed Forces
 Project 404
 Pathet Lao
 Vietnam War
 Khmer National Armed Forces
 Republic of Vietnam Military Forces
 Royal Lao Police
 Weapons of the Laotian Civil War

Notes

References

Andrea Matles Savada (ed.), Laos: a country study (3rd ed.), Federal Research Division, Library of Congress, Washington, D.C. 1995. , OCLC 32394600. – 
Albert Grandolini, Armor of the Vietnam War (2): Asian Forces, Concord Publications, Hong Kong 1998. 
 Arnold Issacs, Gordon Hardy, MacAlister Brown, et al., Pawns of War: Cambodia and Laos, Boston Publishing Company, Boston 1987. , 9780201116786.
 Alfred William McCoy, Cathleen B. Read, Leonard Palmer Adams, The Politics of Heroin in Southeast Asia, Harper & Row, 1972. , 9789971470227.
 Bernard Fall, Anatomy of a Crisis: The Laotian Crisis of 1960–1961, Doubleday & Co., 1969. 
 Christopher Robbins, Air America, Avon, New York 1979. , 9780399122071.
 Christopher Robbins, The Ravens: Pilots of the Secret War in Laos, Asia Books, Bangkok 2000. , 9789748303413.
 David Corn, Blond Ghost: Ted Shackley and the CIA's Crusades, Simon & Schuster, New York 1994. 
 Joseph D. Celeski, Special Air Warfare and the Secret War in Laos: Air Commandos 1964–1975, Air University Press, Maxwell AFB, Alabama 2019. –   
 Kenneth Conboy and Don Greer, War in Laos 1954–1975, Carrollton, TX: Squadron/Signal Publications, 1994. 
 Kenneth Conboy and Simon McCouaig, South-East Asian Special Forces, Elite series 33, Osprey Publishing Ltd, London 1991. 
 Kenneth Conboy and Simon McCouaig, The War in Laos 1960–75, Men-at-arms series 217, Osprey Publishing Ltd, London 1989. 
 Kenneth Conboy with James Morrison, Shadow War: The CIA's Secret War in Laos, Boulder CO: Paladin Press, 1995. , 1581605358
 Maj. Gen. Oudone Sananikone, The Royal Lao Army and U.S. Army advice and support, Indochina monographs series, United States Army Center of Military History, Washington D.C., 1981. – 
 Thomas Ahern, Undercover Armies: CIA and Surrogate Warfare in Laos, Center for the Study of Intelligence, Washington D.C. 2006. Classified control no. C05303949.
 Timothy Castle, At War in the Shadow of Vietnam: United States Military Aid to the Royal Lao Government, 1955–1975, Columbia University Press, 1993. 
 Victor B. Anthony and Richard R. Sexton, The War in Northern Laos, Command for Air Force History, 1993.

Secondary sources

 Kenneth Conboy, Kenneth Bowra, and Simon McCouaig, The NVA and Viet Cong, Elite 38 series, Osprey Publishing Ltd, Oxford 1992. 
 Kenneth Conboy, FANK: A History of the Cambodian Armed Forces, 1970–1975, Equinox Publishing (Asia) Pte Ltd, Djakarta 2011. 
 Khambang Sibounheuang (edited by Edward Y. Hall), White Dragon Two: A Royal Laotian Commando's Escape from Laos, Spartanburg, SC: Honoribus Press, 2002.

External links
Country Study - Kingdom of Laos
 http://royallao.org/reqcontrib.html
Royal Lao Armed Forces and Police heraldry

 
Military of Laos
Military units and formations established in 1959
Laos
Military units and formations of the Cold War
Military units and formations disestablished in 1975